Lydia "Nellé" Tritton (Russian: Лидия Тереза ("Нелль") Керенская (Триттон)) was an Australian journalist, poet and "public elocutionist".

Biography
Lydia "Nellé" Tritton was born in Brisbane, Australia on 19 September 1899 and died on 10 April 1946.

As a young woman in her mid twenties, Tritton sailed to London and toured Europe, gaining a reputation for knowledge of international affairs, which brought her into contact with Russian expatriates living in Paris. In 1928 she married a former officer of the White Russian Army, Nicholas Alexander Nadejine, 43, in Kensington registry office. Nadejine, a professional singer, was unsuccessful in joining the Covent Garden Opera Company and reportedly had affairs with various rich Englishwomen. The couple divorced in 1936. 

In 1939 Tritton married exiled Russian prime minister Alexander Kerensky in Martins Creek, Pennsylvania and lived in exile in Pennsylvania. Following their wedding, the Kerenskys lived in Paris briefly before moving to New York. In February 1946, while visiting her parents in Brisbane, Australia, Nell suffered a stroke and died of chronic nephritis on 10 April.

The story of her life was turned into a play Motherland, in 2016 by playwright Katherine Lyall-Watson.

References

Further reading

1899 births
1946 deaths
Australian women journalists
Deaths from nephritis
Australian women poets
Writers from Brisbane
Journalists from Queensland
20th-century Australian journalists
20th-century Australian poets
19th-century Australian women
20th-century Australian women
Elocutionists